Giovanni Giacomo Mattei was the founder of one powerful branch of the house of Mattei. He was Count Palatine of the Lateran Palace and a Conservatore of Rome, 1451. He married in 1437 to Isabella dei conti dell'Anguillara.

Year of birth missing
Year of death missing
G
15th-century Italian nobility